The Unified Team at the 1992 Winter Olympics in Albertville was a joint team consisting of five of the fifteen former Soviet republics: Russia, Ukraine, Kazakhstan, Belarus and Uzbekistan that made a decision to collaborate and created a united team. The Unified Team's only other appearance was at the 1992 Summer Olympics in Barcelona. It competed under the IOC country code EUN (from the French Equipe Unifiée).

The team finished second in the medal rankings, narrowly losing to a re-unified Germany.

Members

Medals by winter sport

Medalists
The Unified Team finished second to Germany both in the gold and overall medal tally with 9 gold medals, 6 silver medals, and 8 bronze medals for a total of 23 medals.

Competitors
The following is the list of number of competitors in the Games.

Alpine skiing

Men

Men's combined

Women

Women's combined

Biathlon

Men

Men's 4 × 7.5 km relay

Women

Women's 3 × 7.5 km relay

Bobsleigh

Cross-country skiing

Men

 1 Starting delay based on 10 km results. 
 C = Classical style, F = Freestyle

Men's 4 × 10 km relay

Women

 2 Starting delay based on 5 km results. 
 C = Classical style, F = Freestyle

Women's 4 × 5 km relay

Figure skating

Men

Women

Pairs

Ice Dancing

Freestyle skiing

Men

Women

Ice hockey

First round
Twelve participating teams were placed in two groups. After playing a round-robin, the top four teams in each group advanced to the Medal Round while the last two teams competed in the Consolation Round for the 9th to 12th places.

Final round
Quarter-finals

Semi-finals

Final

Luge

Men

(Men's) Doubles

Women

Nordic combined 

Men's individual

Events:
 normal hill ski jumping 
 15 km cross-country skiing 

Men's Team

Three participants per team.

Events:
 normal hill ski jumping 
 10 km cross-country skiing

Short track speed skating

Men

Women

Ski jumping 

Men's team large hill

 1 Four teams members performed two jumps each. The best three were counted.

Speed skating

Men

Women

See also
 CIS national football team, a football team created in a similar fashion for UEFA Euro 1992

References

 Olympic Winter Games 1992, full results by sports-reference.com

Nations at the 1992 Winter Olympics
1992
1992 in Belarusian sport
1992 in Kazakhstani sport
1992 in Russian sport
1992 in Ukrainian sport
1992 in Uzbekistani sport